Frank Wynne (born 1962) is an Irish literary translator and writer.

Born in County Sligo in the west of Ireland, he worked as a comics editor at Fleetway and later at comic magazine Deadline. He worked for a time at AOL before becoming a literary translator. He has translated many authors including Michel Houellebecq, Boualem Sansal, Frédéric Beigbeder and the late Ivoirian novelist Ahmadou Kourouma.

He has twice jointly won the International Dublin Literary Award: with Houellebecq for Atomised (his translation of Les Particules élémentaires); and with Alice Zeniter for The Art of Losing (his translation of L'Art de Perdre). His translation of Frédéric Beigbeder's Windows on the World, a novel set in the twin towers of the World Trade Center in New York during the September 11, 2001 attacks, won the 2005 Independent Foreign Fiction Prize.

Notably, he is a two-time winner of both the Scott Moncrieff Translation Prize for translation from the French (in 2008 for Frédéric Beigbeder's Holiday in a Coma and Love Lasts Three Years and in 2015 for Boualem Sansal's Harraga) and the Premio Valle Inclán for Spanish Translation (in 2011 for Marcelo Figueras's Kamchatka and in 2013 for Alonso Cueto's The Blue Hour).

His book, I Was Vermeer, a biography of Han van Meegeren, was published by Bloomsbury in August 2006 and serialised as the BBC Radio 4 "Book of the Week" (read by Anton Lesser) in August 2006.

He has edited two major anthologies for Head of Zeus, Found in Translation: 100 of the finest stories every translated, (2018) and the QUEER: LGBTQ Writing from Ancient Times to Yesterday (2021)

In 2021, it was announced that he would be the Chair of the judging panel of the 2022 International Booker Prize - the first time a translator has chaired the panel.

Selected translations
 Atomised by Michel Houellebecq
 Platform by Michel Houellebecq (adapted by Carnal Acts for the Institute of Contemporary Arts (ICA))
 Lanzarote by Michel Houellebecq
 The Patagonian Hare : A Memoir by Claude Lanzmann (shortlisted for the 2013 French-American Florence Gould Translation Prize)
 An Unfinished Business (published in the US as The German Mudjahid) by Boualem Sansal
 The Frozen Heart by Almudena Grandes
 The Blue Hour by Alonso Cueto (shortlisted for the 2013 Oxford-Weidenfeld Translation Prize)
 What the Day Owes the Night by Yasmina Khadra
 Kamchatka by Marcelo Figueras
 Journey to the Centre of the Earth by Jules Verne
 Windows on the World by Frédéric Beigbeder
 Mammals by Pierre Mérot
 Waiting for the Wild Beasts to Vote by Ahmadou Kourouma
 Allah is Not Obliged by Ahmadou Kourouma
 The Little Book of Philosophy by André Comte-Sponville
 Working Knowledge by Petr Král
 Forever Nude by Guy Goffette
 Banquet of Lies by  Amin Zaoui
 Somewhere in a Desert by Dominique Sigaud (a New York Times notable book)
 In the Beginning Was the Sea by Tomás González
 Liveforever by Andrés Caicedo
 Vernon Subutex 1 by Virginie Despentes (shortlisted for the Man Booker International Prize 2018)
 The Impostor by Javier Cercas (longlisted for the Man Booker International Prize 2018)
 The Great Swindle (2015) [Au revoir là-haut] by Pierre Lemaitre
 Among the Lost (2018) [Las tierras arrasadas] by Emiliano Monge
 Animalia (2019) [Règne animal] by Jean-Baptiste Del Amo
 The Art of Losing (2021) [L'Art de Perdre] by Alice Zeniter

Awards
 2022: Winner of the International Dublin Literary Award for the translation of “the Art of Losing“, by Alice Zeniter
 2020: Winner of the Republic of Consciousness Prize for the translation of "Animalia" by Jean-Baptiste del Amo
 2016: Winner of the Scott Moncrieff Prize for the translation of Harraga by Boualem Sansal
 2015: Winner of the CWA International Dagger for the translation of Camille by Pierre Lemaitre
 2014: Winner of the CWA International Dagger for the translation of The Siege by Arturo Perez-Reverte
 2014: Winner of the Premio Valle-Inclán for the translation of The Blue Hour by Alonso Cueto
 2013: Joint Winner of the CWA International Dagger for the translation of Alex by Pierre Lemaitre
 2012: Winner of the Premio Valle-Inclán for the translation of Kamchatka by Marcelo Figueras
 2008: Winner of the Scott Moncrieff Prize for the translation of Holiday in a Coma and Love Lasts Three Years by Frédéric Beigbeder
 2005: Winner of the Independent Foreign Fiction Prize for Windows on the World by Frédéric Beigbeger
 2002: Winner of the International Dublin Literary Award for Atomised' by Michel Houellebecq

References

External links
 Frank Wynne
 Michel Houellebecq
 S.N.O.B. Site Non Officiel de Frédéric Beigbeder
 Allah is Not Obliged
 UNESCO appraisal of Ahmadou Kourouma
 Honorary Members of the Irish Translators and Interpreters Association
 Vernon Subutex book site in English

1962 births
Living people
Comic book editors
French–English translators
Spanish–English translators
Irish translators
People from County Sligo
Literary translators